Transmembrane and coiled-coil domains 4, TMCO4, is a protein in humans that is encoded by the TMCO4 gene. Currently, its function is not well defined. It is transmembrane protein that is predicted to cross the endoplasmic reticulum membrane three times. TMCO4 interacts with other proteins known to play a role in cancer development, hinting at a possible role in the disease of cancer.

Gene 

TMCO4 is located on the minus strand of the first chromosome at 1p36.13. The gene consists of 118,172 base pairs stretching from base pair 19,682,213 through 19,800,385. There are no common aliases for TMCO4. Genes CAPZB and LOC105376823 neighbor TMCO4 on chromosome 1. TMCO4 consists of 16 exons.

mRNA 

There are twenty mRNA transcript variants (X1-X20) produced through different combinations of sixteen different exons. The most common variant is X1, which includes all exons and spans the entire 118,172 base pairs.

Protein

Primary sequence 

The most common protein encoded by TMCO4 is 634 amino acids in length with accession number XP_011539488.1.

General properties and composition 

The molecular weight of TMCO4 is 67.9 kiloDaltons. The isoelectric point is 5.48. As a whole protein, TMCO4 does not have abnormal amino acid distributions. It does have three long stretches of no charge that correspond with the location of the three different transmembrane regions. The first cytosolic domain of TMCO4 does have abnormally high amounts of leucine and glutamic acid and abnormally low amounts of asparagine. The larger lumenal domain of TMCO4 also has an abnormally low amount of asparagine and phenylalanine.

Protein features 

Two main areas of interest within the TMCO4 protein are the three transmembrane regions and the large Abhydrolase region. The N-terminus of TMCO4 is predicted to be within the cytosol of the cell, and the C-terminus is predicted to be within the lumen of the endoplasmic retiticulum. TMCO4 is also predicted to have a leucine zipper and a large coiled coil domain.

Secondary structure 

The secondary structure of TMCO4 is predicted to be dominated by alpha helices based on predictions by iTASSER software.

Post-translational modifications 

Many phosphorylation sites were predicted for the two cytosolic regions of TMCO4. O-linked glycosylation sites were predicted to occur in the end of the second lumenal region of TMCO4. These predicted sites can be seen on both the schematic illustration of TMCO4 found above, or in the conceptual translation of TMCO4 found below.

Subcellular localization 

TMCO4 is consistently predicted to be located in the endoplasmic reticulum membrane across many homologs.

Interacting proteins 

TMCO4 has been found to interact with many proteins. One protein of interest that TMCO4 interacts with is FLT1. FLT1 is a VEGF receptor. VEGF is known to play a significant role in cancer development. Other proteins that TMCO4 has been experimentally shown to interact with are UBB, UBC, KPTN, and BVLF1. UBB and UBC are polyubiquitins that target molecules for degradation, suggesting that TMCO4 is degraded at some point. KPTN is a protein that is essential in neuromorphogenesis. BVLF1 is an Epstein-Barr virus protein.

Homology

Paralogs 

TMCO4 does not have any paralogs.

Orthologs 

Orthologs to TMCO4 can be found in bacteria, protists, plants, fungi, trichoplax, invertebrates, fish, amphibians, reptiles, birds and mammals. Some of these orthologs can be found in the table below. The orthologs are sorted in descending order of date of evolution from humans and then descending order of percent sequence identity. TMCO4 is a fast evolving gene that has been highly conserved throughout evolution. Regions of TMCO4 that are highly conserved across the orthologs include the various transmembrane domains and the abhydrolase region.

Expression 

TMCO4 is highly expressed in many tissues. Highest expression occurs within the prostate, trachea, uterus, small intestine, placenta, thyroid, salivary gland, and adrenal gland. Expression of TMCO4 is predicted to be controlled by many transcription factors.

Clinical Significance 

TMCO4 is not currently directly linked to any disease or phenotype. However, interacting with a VEGF receptor may be indicative of a possible role in cancer.

References

Genes on human chromosome 1
Human proteins
Transmembrane proteins